Chrysothrix flavovirens is a species of crustose and corticolous (bark-dwelling) lichen in the family Chrysotrichaceae. It was formally described as a new species in 1994 by Tor Tønsberg as the sorediate counterpart of the common and widespread Chrysothrix candelaris. The type specimen was collected from Kirkeøy, Norway, where it was found growing on Picea abies. It has a pale greenish-yellow thallus that contains rhizocarpic acid. The lichen is widespread in Europe, and has also been recorded from Japan and North America. In the Atlantic and Mediterranean biogeographic regions of Portugal, it prefers to grow on the acidic bark of coastal conifer trees.

References

flavovirens
Lichen species
Lichens described in 1994
Lichens of Europe
Lichens of Japan
Lichens of North America